Jean-Jacques Brochier (28 December 1937 – 29 October 2004 from cancer), the son of a physician, was a French journalist, and chief editor of Le Magazine Littéraire from 1968 to 2004.

Biography 
As a student, he was actively engaged with the NLF and became a member of the Réseau Jeanson. On 24 November 1960, while he was vice-president of the General Assembly of the students of Lyon, he was arrested along with his wife in support of the struggle for the independence of Algeria. On 14 April 1961 they were both sentenced to ten years imprisonment and jailed in prisons Saint- Paul then Montluc. He was struck with indignité nationale. He will finally be sentenced to three years in prison before receiving a presidential pardon.

He published several novels, including Un jeune homme bien élevé (1978) (Prix des Sept 1979), Un cauchemar (1984) Prix du Livre Inter (1985), and L'Hallali (1987). He is also the author of essays - notably on Camus, Sade, Vailland, Robbe-Grillet, Maupassant and Sartre - and the pamphlet entitled .

In 1997, Jean-Jacques Brochier established with Danièle Brison and  the prize "Printemps du Roman", awarded each year at Saint-Louis (Haut-Rhin), at the book fair of which he was president until his death in 2004. The presidency has since been awarded to a different jury member each year.

Private life 
Passionate about hunting, a painter, he published a collection of anthologies on woodcock, wild boar, deer, rabbit, wild ducks and snipe. He married Nicole Brochier, born April 8, 1937.

Distinctions 
1985: Prix du Livre Inter for Un cauchemar
2000:

Bibliography 
1969: , Paris, Éric Losfeld, 148 p.
1982: Villa Marguerite, Paris, Albin Michel
1984: Une enfance lyonnaise au temps du Maréchal, ACE éditeur
1984: Un cauchemar, Albin Michel, Prix du Livre Inter 1985
1987: L'hallali, Albin Michel
1994: Anthologie de la bécassine et des petits échassiers, Paris, Hatier, 221 p.
1995: Pour Sartre : le jour où Sartre refusa le Nobel, Paris, JC Lattès
1996: Chroniques du Capricorne 1977–1983, Encrages éditions
2002: Un jeune homme bien élevé, Paris, La Différence, coll. Minos
2005: Pour l'amour des livres - interviews with Nadine Sautel, Albin Michel
1980: Odette Genonceau, Albin Michel

References

External links 
 Jean-Jacques Brochier on Babelio
 La mort de Jean-Jacques Brochier, journaliste et écrivain on La Croix (2 November 2014)
 Jean-Jacques Brochier on Who's Who?
 Jean-Jacques Brochier on Mercure de France
 Jean-Jacques Brochier on République des Lettres
 Jean-Jacques Brochier publications on CAIRN
 Décès du critique littéraire Jean-Jacques Brochier on Libération'' (30 October 2004)
 Jean-Jacques Brochier à propos de Tolkien on INA.fr (5 January 1973)

20th-century French writers
20th-century male writers
21st-century French writers
Prix du Livre Inter winners
Sartre scholars
Writers from Lyon
1937 births
2004 deaths
Deaths from cancer in France